KXNU-LD (channel 10) is a low-power television station in Laredo, Texas, United States, affiliated with the Spanish-language Telemundo network. It is owned by Gray Television alongside dual NBC/ABC affiliate KGNS-TV (channel 8) and dual CBS/CW+ affiliate KYLX-LD (channel 13). The stations share studios on Del Mar Boulevard (near I-35) in northern Laredo, while KXNU-LD's transmitter is located on Shea Street north of downtown.

History 
The station's history traces back to 2008, when KGNS launched a third digital subchannel, affiliated with Telemundo. The station went on the air on July 12, 2011 as K10QK-D, owned by SagamoreHill Broadcasting and simulcasting KGNS-TV's third subchannel. It was sold to Gray Television on December 31, 2013, along with KGNS-TV. On October 4, 2018, the station's call sign was changed to KXNU-LD.

Newscasts 
Newscasts on the station have existed since 2010, having branded as TeleNoticias Laredo ever since then. In 2015, the newscasts switched to a set of Gray Television graphics and the "Telemundo News" theme from Cacharros Musik. On September 7, 2020, the newscasts switched to a newer set of Gray Television graphics and both "U-Phonix" and "Third Coast" from Stephen Arnold Music.

Subchannel

References

External links
Telemundo Laredo

XNU-LD
Gray Television
Telemundo network affiliates
Television channels and stations established in 2019
2019 establishments in Texas
Low-power television stations in the United States